XSB is the name of a dialect of the Prolog programming language and its implementation developed at Stony Brook University in collaboration with the Katholieke Universiteit Leuven, the New University of Lisbon, Uppsala University and software vendor XSB, Inc.

XSB extends Prolog with tabled resolution and HiLog (a standard extension of Prolog permitting limited higher-order logic programming).

The open source XSB implementation includes an interface to the Java programming language.

History

XSB was originally developed at Stony Brook University by David S. Warren, Terrance Swift, and Kostis Sagonas. It was based on the SB-Prolog language that was also developed at Stony Brook University in 1986. It is a logic programming language.

Syntax

XSB supports several standard programming language data types such as Integers, Floating Point numbers, and Atoms.

Integers in XSB can be interpreted in multiple bases. By default integers are interpreted in base 10 but can be interpreted in a range of bases from 2 to 36.

Atoms are similar to Strings. They are a sequence of characters.

External links
 XSB
 XSB technical summary
 Programming in Tabled Prolog: draft of a book about XSB programming by David S. Warren of Stony Brook University
 The XSB System Programmer's Manual by Terrance Swift, David S. Warren, and others
 Information on Stony Brook Prolog

References
 T. Swift and D.S. Warren (2011), XSB: Extending the Power of Prolog using Tabling. Theory and Practice of Logic Programming (TPLP), Cambridge University Press, 2011.
 K. Sagonas and T. Swift and D.S. Warren (1994), XSB as an Efficient Deductive Database Engine. Proceedings of the ACM SIGMOD International Conference on the Management of Data, 1994.
 T. Swift and D.S. Warren (1995), An abstract machine for SLG resolution: Definite programs. Proceedings of the Symposium on Logic Programming, 1995.

Logic programming languages